"Killed by Death" is episode 18 of season two of Buffy the Vampire Slayer. It was written by Rob Des Hotel and Dean Batali, directed by Deran Sarafian, and first broadcast on March 3, 1998.

After flu lands Buffy in the hospital, she rescues fevered children from Der Kindestod, a demon that turns out to have killed her cousin when she was younger and which gave her a phobia of hospitals.

Plot 
Weak with flu, Buffy collapses after a fight with Angelus. She is admitted to the hospital, much against her will. Her mother reveals that Buffy has hated hospitals ever since she saw her beloved cousin, Celia, die in one when she was eight years old.

That night, in what may be a dream, Buffy sees a young boy, Ryan, being followed by a strange-looking creature. She then starts having flashbacks of Celia's time in the hospital. Buffy awakes and takes a walk down the hall where she see two men remove a dead child from the children's ward. At the door, she overhears an argument between Dr. Backer and Dr. Wilkinson about Backer's experimental treatments on the kids. She meets Ryan who tells her that "Death" comes at night.

The next morning, Buffy tells her friends about the overheard conversation. Since she is forced to stay at the hospital, she plans to find out what the doctor is up to and Xander volunteers everyone's help. Cordelia and Xander sneak into the hospital's record room and search for records on the girl who died in the night. Meanwhile, Giles and Willow search for information at the school library.

Buffy visits Ryan who is drawing a picture of the monster she saw the night before. Willow finds that Dr. Backer has a long history of controversial experimental treatments and investigations into his practices. Dr. Backer goes to the children's ward with his latest experimental treatment. Before he can do anything, an invisible creature kills him as Ryan watches in terror.

In the morning, Buffy informs everyone that Dr. Backer is not the suspect and shows them Ryan's drawing of the creature. At the library, Cordelia finds a picture of Ryan's monster on the cover of a book; they learn that it is called Kindestod (German: 'the child's death'), a demon that absorbs the life force of sickly children, making it seem that they died of their illness. They report to Buffy by telephone, and she realises that Backer was murdered because he was curing the children and depriving the monster of food. Buffy also recognizes to her horror that this monster is what killed Celia whilst Buffy watched helplessly.

Buffy and Willow go to Dr. Backer's office, where they find that he was giving the children injections of the virus they already have, to stimulate their immune response. Buffy realizes that only feverish people can see the demon, so she decides to re-infect herself with the virus.

Buffy stumbles to the children's ward but finds all the children are gone. She sees Kindestod in the room and watches as it heads down to the basement. The children hide quietly, but Kindestod finds them and attacks Ryan. It begins to suck his life out, growing two protuberances from its eyes and attaching them to his forehead. Buffy arrives and fights Kindestod. Just as it is about to suck her life out, she snaps its neck. Later that day, Buffy finishes recuperating at home and Xander and Willow decide to keep her company. Buffy receives a bloody drawing from Ryan picturing her how she killed the monster.

Continuity
Xander's unresolved romantic feelings for Buffy, which began in Season 1, are brought up, first by Angelus when he attempts to enter Buffy's hospital room; Angelus taunts Xander about his love for Buffy and how it must irk him that Angel took Buffy's virginity. An annoyed Cordelia later tells Xander that his loyalty to Buffy is not attractive (his later love interest, Anya, will make similar complaints) and how she knows that he took friendship with Buffy as a way of being close to her, since she didn't see him in a romantic way. This may explain Xander's anger and frustration over Buffy's romantic choices throughout the series, as from his perspective ordinary guys like him don't seem to "do it" for her.

See also
 The Sandman (short story)

References

External links

 

Buffy the Vampire Slayer (season 2) episodes
1998 American television episodes
Television episodes about diseases and disorders